"Heart to Heart" is a song performed by British singer-songwriter James Blunt, from his fourth studio album Moon Landing (2013). It was released on February 3, 2014, as a digital download. The song has peaked to number 42 on the UK Singles Chart, the song has also charted in Australia, Austria, Belgium, Germany, Italy and Switzerland. The song was written by James Blunt, Daniel Omelio and Daniel Parker.

Music video
A music video to accompany the release of "Heart to Heart" was first released onto YouTube on December 17, 2013, at a total length of 3:41 minutes.

Track listing

Charts and certifications

Weekly charts

Year-end charts

Certifications

Release history

References

2014 singles
2014 songs
James Blunt songs
Songs written by James Blunt
Songs written by Robopop
Songs written by Danny Parker (songwriter)
Atlantic Records singles